Handschuh may refer to:
German word for glove
Der Handschuh, 1797 ballad by Friedrich Schiller
Der Handschuh (Waterhouse), 2005 setting to music of Schiller's ballad
Karl-Heinz Handschuh (born 1947), German football player
Steffen Handschuh (born 1980), German football player

See also

Handshoe, Kentucky